Tal Salhab (also spelled Tal Selhab) is a town in the western center of Syria, administratively part of the Hama Governorate, located  northwest of Hama. It is situated on the southern edge of the Ghab plain and by the western bank of the Orontes River. Nearby localities include Nahr al-Bared, Asharnah and al-Suqaylabiyah to the north, Deir Shamil and Deir Mama to the south, Tremseh, Mhardeh and Halfaya to the east.

According to the Syria Central Bureau of Statistics, Tell Salhab had a population of 15,454 in the 2004 census. It is also the center of a nahiyah ("subdistrict"), part of the Al-Suqaylabiyah District, consisting of 18 localities and with a combined population of 38,783 in 2004. In the early 1960s its population was around 700. Its inhabitants are predominantly Alawites.

The town was the traditional seat of the Jnaid clan, which typically provided the leaders of the Alawite Kalbiyya confederation. In 1978 a  sugar refinery was built in Tell Salhab at a cost of $50 million. The refinery complex boasted a sugar beet silo, a washing plant, pulp presses and dryers, and a water reservoir.

Archaeological excavations
Near Tell Salhab is located Tell 'Acharneh, a large mound which is believed to be the location of the ancient city of Tunip. Archaeological excavations have been ongoing at the site.

References

Populated places in al-Suqaylabiyah District
Towns in Hama Governorate
Alawite communities in Syria